The George Sr. and Ellen Banta House is located in Menasha, Wisconsin.

History
The house was originally built in 1878. Later, it underwent significant renovations in 1888.

The house was originally occupied by George Banta and his wife, Ellen. Banta, who also became a prominent local politician, began producing prints on a small press in the dining room of the house, an endeavor which eventually turned into the Banta Corporation.

In 1997, the house was added to both the State and the National Register of Historic Places.

References

Houses on the National Register of Historic Places in Wisconsin
National Register of Historic Places in Winnebago County, Wisconsin
Houses in Winnebago County, Wisconsin
Queen Anne architecture in Wisconsin
Brick buildings and structures
Limestone buildings in the United States
Houses completed in 1888